James Benson Dudley High School is located in the southeastern quadrant of Guilford County in the city of Greensboro, North Carolina. Dudley High School was founded in 1929 as the first black high school in Guilford County, in a school system segregated by law. The school was named for James Benson Dudley.

History
The high school building was designed by architect Charles C. Hartmann and built in 1929.  James B. Dudley Senior High School is a three-story, "U"-shaped, brick building with Classical Revival and Collegiate Gothic design elements.  It has a one-story slightly projecting entrance portico with Doric order columns (added in the mid-1970's), a stepped parapet, and crenellated stair towers.  The gymnasium was attached in 1936.  A separate brick gymnasium building was constructed in 1959.

James Benson Dudley Senior High School and Gymnasium was listed on the National Register of Historic Places in 2003.

The school was central to the 1969 Greensboro uprising when school officials refused to recognize the validity of a write-in candidate for student council, allegedly due to his activism in the Black Power movement. In 1971 through desegregation, Dudley's student population integrated.

Today, the make-up of the school consists of a diverse student enrollment with a predominantly African-American population.  Dudley has a traditional education program as well as the Dudley Science, Math, and Technology Academy magnet program.  The Science, Math, and Technology Academy provide high-caliber students a strong college preparatory background, which emphasizes mathematics and science along with sufficient writing, research, and technological skills.  During their senior year, Dudley Academy Students attend classes on college campuses.
Dudley won 2 back-to-back football rings. The school colors are Blue and Gold. Dudley High School has an Advance Vehicle Technology(AVT) Team that competes in an international competition called the Shell Eco Marathon.

Notable alumni
Elreta Melton Alexander-Ralston (class of 1934), first African-American judge in North Carolina, first black woman to graduate from Columbia Law School
Tom Alston, first African-American Major League Baseball player for the St. Louis Cardinals
David Amerson (class of 2010), football player for Oakland Raiders
Clarence Avant, music executive, known as "Godfather of Black Music", left Dudley in junior year (1947)
Ezell A. Blair, Jr. (class of 1959), African American civil rights activist, one of Greensboro Four, graduated from Dudley High School
 Joey Cheek (class of 1997), speed skater and former inline speed skater, 2006 Winter Olympics gold medalist
 King Virgil Cheek (class of 1955), former President of Shaw University and Morgan State University
 Brett Claywell (class of 1996), actor, played Tim Smith on CW series One Tree Hill and Kyle Lewis on ABC soap opera One Life to Live
Jeff Davis, former NFL player, Tampa Bay Buccaneers 1982–87 and Clemson, 1982 Orange Bowl champion; inducted into College Football Hall of Fame in 2007
Marques Douglas (class of 1995), former NFL player for San Francisco 49ers, attended Dudley High School
Beverly M. Earle (class of 1961), first black woman to represent Mecklenburg County in North Carolina House of Representatives
Clarence Grier (class of 1983), college basketball player
P. J. Hairston, North Carolina basketball player, transferred to Hargrave Military Academy for his senior year
Will Graves, Maccabi Haifa basketball player
Brendan Haywood (class of 1997), NBA player for Charlotte Bobcats, graduated from Dudley High School
Hendon Hooker, Tennessee Volunteers Quarterback
Lou Hudson (class of 1962), NBA player for St. Louis Hawks, 6-time All-Star, graduated from Dudley High School
Yvonne Johnson (class of 1960), first African-American mayor of Greensboro
Debra L. Lee (class of 1972), President and CEO of BET Holdings, Inc.
Joyce Martin Dixon (class of 1952), businesswoman and philanthropist
Jerry Gantt, former NFL and CFL player
Mac McCain (class of 2016), NFL player
Emmanuel Moseley (class of 2014), football player for the San Francisco 49ers
Natalie Murdock, politician
Fred Neal (class of 1958), guard for demonstration basketball team Harlem Globetrotters and noted dribbler, attended Dudley High School
Kenny Okoro, football player
DeMario Pressley (class of 2004), former NFL defensive tackle, graduated from Dudley High School
Lynnae Quick (class of 2001), NASA scientist specializing in planetary geophysics and ocean worlds; first African American awarded the Harold C. Urey Prize; namesake for asteroid 37349Lynnaequick
David L. Richmond (class of 1959), civil rights activist, one of Greensboro Four, graduated from Dudley High School
Charlie Sanders (class of 1964), 2007 Pro Football Hall of Fame tight end for Detroit Lions, attended Dudley High School
Jessie Carney Smith, librarian and educator
George Simkins, Jr. (class of 1940), civil rights activist, NAACP president
Barbara Weathers (class of 1981), soul singer (with Atlantic Starr)

Notable faculty
Nelle A. Coley, famed educator and civil rights activist, taught English at James B. Dudley High School for over thirty years.

See also
 List of high schools in North Carolina

References

External links
 Official website

African-American history of North Carolina
Historically segregated African-American schools in North Carolina
School buildings on the National Register of Historic Places in North Carolina
1929 establishments in North Carolina
Educational institutions established in 1929
National Register of Historic Places in Guilford County, North Carolina
Public high schools in North Carolina
Schools in Greensboro, North Carolina
Magnet schools in North Carolina